Mary Ann Winkowski is a television personality whose paranormal experiences are the basis for CBS's Ghost Whisperer, on which she was also a paid producer. She currently resides in North Royalton, Ohio. Winkowski is often paid to attend funerals to help relatives have one last conversation with a loved one. Her books include As Alive, So Dead and When Ghosts Speak. Winkowski and Kennedy have what Kennedy calls a "Battle of the Ghosts."

References

External links
 Personal website

People from North Royalton, Ohio
Living people
American spiritual mediums
Year of birth missing (living people)